Satkhira-2 is a constituency represented in the Jatiya Sangsad (National Parliament) of Bangladesh since 2014 by Mir Mostaque Ahmed Robi of the Awami League.

Boundaries 
The constituency encompasses Satkhira Sadar Upazila.

History 
The constituency was created in 1984 from the Khulna-14 constituency when the former Khulna District was split into three districts: Bagerhat, Khulna, and Satkhira.

In the 2018 general election, the constituency was one of six chosen by lottery to use electronic voting machines.

Members of Parliament

Elections

Elections in the 2010s

Elections in the 2000s

Elections in the 1990s

References

External links
 

Parliamentary constituencies in Bangladesh
Satkhira District